HR 3220 is a binary star system in the southern constellation of Carina. It has the Bayer designation B Carinae; HR 3220 is the designation from the Bright Star Catalogue. It has a yellow-white hue and is visible to the naked eye with an apparent visual magnitude of 4.75. Based upon parallax measurements, it is located at a distance of 59 light years from the Sun. The system is drifting further away with a radial velocity of +24 km/s.

The secondary is most likely a helium white dwarf with 0.47 times the mass of the Sun. Mass transfer from the white dwarf progenitor has given the primary the spectral signature of a blue straggler that appears much younger than its actual age of about 10 billion years.

References
 

F-type main-sequence stars
Blue stragglers
White dwarfs

Carina (constellation)
Carinae, B
Durchmusterung objects
0297.1
068456
039903
3220
Spectroscopic binaries